Thamayanoor is a village in Salem district, Valapady Taluk in Tamil Nadu, India.

Villages in Salem district
Villages in Vazhapadi taluk